The Collinsella-1 RNA motif denotes a particular conserved RNA structure discovered by bioinformatics.  Of the six sequences belonging to this motif that were originally identified, five are from uncultivated bacteria residing in the human gut, while only the sixth is in a cultivated species, Collinsella aerofaciens.  The evidence supporting the stem-loops designated as "P1" and "P2" is ambiguous.

See also
Acido-Lenti-1 RNA motif
Bacteroidales-1 RNA motif
Chloroflexi-1 RNA motif
Flavo-1 RNA motif

References

External links
 

Non-coding RNA